Li Xiucheng (1823 – August 7, 1864) was a military rebel commander opposing the Qing dynasty during the Taiping Rebellion. He was born to a peasant family. In 1864, he was captured and interrogated following the third and final Battle of Nanjing. He was then executed by Zeng Guofan.

Name 
He was sometimes called the Loyal King, or Zhong Wang. This title was bestowed after he refused a bribe from a Qing general officer to kill Hong Xiuquan, the founder and leader of the rebellion.

Biography

Second rout of the Jiangnan Army Group
Army Group Jiangnan (江南大營) was an important Qing army barracks in Nanjing. Forces led by Li Xiucheng besieged the barracks in an attempt to force its occupants to surrender. Beginning from March 1858 during the second encirclement, the Qing army commanded 200,000 soldiers to fight with Taiping forces , but they were routed by Li Xiucheng in May 1860. After that, Li went on to occupy all of Jiangsu provinces except Shanghai.

Nanking 
Li worked together with fellow Taiping General Chen Yucheng to defend and release the capital during the siege of Nanking in 1860.

Two attacks on Shanghai

Battle of Shanghai (1861), the second time

Escape from Suzhou
Li Xiucheng's palace in Suzhou is the only one from the Taiping Rebellion that exists today. In July 1863, Li ordered his daughter's husband, Tan Shaoguang, to capture Suzhou. But Li Hongzhang led the Huai Army combined by the "Ever Victorious Army," which, having been raised by an American named Frederick Townsend Ward, was placed under the command of Charles George Gordon. With this support, Li Hongzhang gained numerous victories leading to the surrender of Suzhou.

Trivia
According to one legend, three months after Donkey Jiang (蔣驢子) became the manager of Li Xiucheng's stables in 1864 — and before the fall of Nanjing — Li Xiucheng took his wealth (including much plunder) to Donkey Jiang. At Li's request, Jiang quickly transported that wealth outside the Nanjing area, planning to meet back up with Li later. Jiang delivered on his promise to accompany the transport with 20 horses and an ox, but Li was captured and executed before he could rendezvous with Jiang. Jiang was left with wealth that he was able to bring back to Nanjing after the war.

Writing
Loyal Prince Li Xiucheng In His Own Words (《忠王李秀成自述》) is his autobiographical account written shortly before his execution.

Li's sword 
When Li withdrew from Suzhou, his sword - the symbol of power - was given to his young brother Li Shixian. Li Shixian took this sword, but it was confiscated when Li was captured by Charles George Gordon in Liyang.

When Charles George Gordon returned to the UK with Li's sword, he presented it to Queen Victoria's cousin, Chief Commander of the Military the Duke of Cambridge.

On 30 August 1961, the sword ended up in the hands of a history professor at the University of London. In 1981, this sword was returned to China where it is currently stored in the National Museum of China.

Children
Li Xiucheng had a son Li Ronfar and three daughters. Li's daughters married Taiping generals, including Tan Shaoguang and Chen Binwen.

Sources
 
 Tiān Guó Zwi(天國志)
 李秀成：太平天国后期军事统帅

References

1823 births
1864 deaths
19th-century executions by China
Hakka generals
Executed people from Guangxi
Executed Taiping Heavenly Kingdom people
Military leaders of the Taiping Rebellion
People executed by the Qing dynasty
People from Wuzhou